Koffee Brown was an American R&B and  neo-soul duo consisting of male singer Falonte "Fonz" Moore and female singer Vernell "Vee" Sales. They were discovered by music producer Kay Gee and RL of Next, and were signed to Arista Records. They are best known for their songs "After Party", and "Weekend Thing".

Mars/Venus
Their first and only album, Mars/Venus, was released on March 6, 2001, and featured the single "After Party," which peaked at Number 44 on the Billboard Hot 100. The album itself peaked at Number 32 on the Billboard 200.  It performed considerably better on Billboard's R&B Chart, however, peaking at Number 7.

Discography

References 

American soul musical groups
African-American musical groups
American musical duos
Contemporary R&B duos
American contemporary R&B musical groups
Arista Records artists